The Syracuse and Baldwinsville Railroad was established in 1886 and opened for business in 1887.

In 1886, Delaware, Lackawanna and Western Railroad (DL&WRR) bought the road and it was renamed to Syracuse and Baldwinsville Railway in 1891. DL&WRR formally abandoned the line in 1897.

References

External links 
 Greater Baldwinsville - By Sue Ellen McManus, 2010

Predecessors of the Delaware, Lackawanna and Western Railroad
Defunct railroads in Syracuse, New York
Defunct New York (state) railroads
Railway companies established in 1886
Railway companies disestablished in 1891
1886 establishments in New York (state)
1891 disestablishments in New York (state)